George Heinrich Valentine (20 June 1899 – 24 December 1980) was an Australian rules footballer who played with Richmond and Footscray in the Victorian Football League (VFL).

Notes

External links 

1899 births
1980 deaths
Australian rules footballers from Bendigo
Footscray Football Club (VFA) players
Richmond Football Club players
Western Bulldogs players
Williamstown Football Club players